Walnutport is a borough in Northampton County, Pennsylvania. It was first incorporated in 1909. The population of Walnutport was 2,067 at the 2020 census. 

Walnutport is located along the Lehigh River and is part of the Lehigh Valley metropolitan area, which had a population of 861,899 and was the 68th most populous metropolitan area in the U.S. as of the 2020 census. The ZIP Code is 18088.

Geography
Walnutport is located at  (40.751554, -75.595574). According to the U.S. Census Bureau, the borough has a total area of 0.8 square miles (2.1 km2), of which 0.8 square miles (1.9 km2)  is land and 0.1 square miles (0.2 km2)  (7.41%) is water.

Transportation

Pennsylvania Route 145 is the only numbered highway serving Walnutport. It follows Best Avenue on a north-south alignment along the eastern edge of the borough.

Demographics
At the 2000 census there were 2,043 people, 809 households, and 584 families residing in the borough. The population density was 2,727.6 people per square mile (1,051.7/km2). There were 865 housing units at an average density of 1,154.8 per square mile (445.3/km2).  The racial makeup of the borough was 97.45% White, 0.39% African American, 0.34% Native American, 1.17% Asian, 0.39% from other races, and 0.24% from two or more races. Hispanic or Latino of any race were 1.52%.

There were 809 households, 28.9% had children under the age of 18 living with them, 58.1% were married couples living together, 9.9% had a female householder with no husband present, and 27.7% were non-families. 23.1% of households were made up of individuals, and 11.7% were one person aged 65 or older. The average household size was 2.46 and the average family size was 2.88.

In the borough, the population was spread out, with 22.0% under the age of 18, 6.4% from 18 to 24, 29.6% from 25 to 44, 24.7% from 45 to 64, and 17.3% 65 or older. The median age was 40 years. For every 100 females there were 90.0 males. For every 100 females age 18 and over, there were 89.1 males. The median household income was $41,743 and the median family income was $44,844. Males had a median income of $35,729 versus $21,546 for females. The per capita income for the borough was $18,095. About 8.8% of families and 8.5% of the population were below the poverty line, including 11.5% of those under age 18 and 12.7% of those age 65 or over.

Public education 
The borough is served by the Northern Lehigh School District. Students in grades nine through 12 attend Northern Lehigh High School in Slatington.

Gallery

References

External links

Official Borough of Walnutport website
Walnutport community website 

1830 establishments in Pennsylvania
Boroughs in Northampton County, Pennsylvania
Boroughs in Pennsylvania
Populated places established in 1830
Populated places on the Lehigh River